The siege of Tbilisi was the successful siege of the city of Tbilisi, capital of the Kingdom of Georgia, by the Turco-Mongol conqueror Tamerlane, which ended on 22 November 1386. The official history of his reign, Zafarnama, represents this campaign in Georgia as a jihad.

History
In late autumn 1386, a huge army of Timur attacked Georgia. Timur set out from Kars and assailed Samtskhe, the southernmost principality within the Kingdom of Georgia later in 1386. From there, he marched to Tbilisi which the Georgian king Bagrat V had fortified. Tbilisi was besieged and taken on 22 November 1386, after a fierce fight. The city was pillaged and Bagrat V and his family were imprisoned. The Georgian Chronicle and Armenian Thomas of Metsoph mention the apostasy of the king but represent it as a clever ruse which enabled him to earn a degree of trust from Timur. Bagrat was given some 12,000 troops to reestablish himself in Georgia whose government was run by Bagrat’s son and co-ruler George VII during his father’s absence at Timur’s court. The old king, however, entered in secret negotiations with George who ambushed Bagrat’s Islamic escort, and freed his father.

References

Bibliography 
The Timurid Dynasty 
 René Grousset, L'empire des Steppes, versio francesa 1938 reedició 4ª 1965, i versió anglesa 1970. 
 Hodong Kim, "The Early History of the Moghul Nomads: The Legacy of the Chaghatai Khanate." The Mongol Empire and Its Legacy. Ed. Reuven Amitai-Preiss i David Morgan. Leiden: Brill, 1998. 
 Beatrice Forbes Manz, The Rise and Rule of Tamerlane. Cambridge University Press: Cambridge, 1989. 
 Mirza Muhammad Haidar. The Tarikh-i-Rashidi (A History of the Turks of Central Asia). Traduit per Edward Denison Ross, editat per N. Elias. Londres, 1895.
 Alexander Mikaberidze. Historical Dictionary of Georgia .
 Justin Marozzi. "Tamerlane: Sword of Islam, Conqueror of the World". (2004). 

Tbilisi
Battles involving the Kingdom of Georgia
Tbilisi (1386)
Conflicts in 1386
History of Tbilisi

Tbilisi